Presidential elections were held in El Salvador on 3 February 2019, with voters electing a President and Vice President for a five-year term.

With 90% of the votes counted, the Supreme Electoral Tribunal declared former San Salvador mayor Nayib Bukele of the Grand Alliance for National Unity the winner with over 53% of the total vote, avoiding the need for the second round, which had provisionally been scheduled for March. Upon his ascension to the presidency, Bukele became the first President to not be from one of the two major parties (ARENA or the FMLN) since José Napoleón Duarte left office in 1989.

Presidential primaries

Farabundo Martí National Liberation Front

Candidates

Nominee
Hugo Martínez, Foreign Minister of El Salvador, former secretary general of the Central American Integration System and former deputy of the Legislative Assembly.

Eliminated in the primary
Gerson Martínez, Former deputy of the Legislative Assembly.

Results

Nationalist Republican Alliance

Candidates

Nominee
Carlos Calleja, businessman

Eliminated in the primary
Javier Simán, businessman
Gustavo López Davidson, businessman

Results

Grand Alliance for National Unity

Candidates

Nominee
Nayib Bukele, Mayor of San Salvador.

Withdrawn
Will Salgado, Former Mayor of San Miguel.

Results

Presidential candidates

Opinion polls

Results

By department

See also
 Elections in El Salvador

References

El Salvador
Presidential election
El Salvador
Presidential elections in El Salvador
Nayib Bukele